The 2014 Charleston Southern Buccaneers football team represented Charleston Southern University as a member of the Big South Conference during the 2014 NCAA Division I FCS football season. Led by second-year head coach Jamey Chadwell, the Buccaneers compiled an overall record of 8–4 with a mark of 3–2 in conference play, tying for third place in the Big South. Charleston Southern played home games at Buccaneer Field in Charleston, South Carolina.

Schedule

Ranking movements

References

Charleston Southern
Charleston Southern Buccaneers football seasons
Charleston Southern Buccaneers football